Mullah Habibullah was an Afghan who died while in US custody on December 4, 2002.
His death was one of those classed as a homicide, though the initial military statement described his death as due to natural causes.

Habibullah's brother was a Taliban leader.
Carlotta Gall, The New York Times reporter in Afghanistan, was the first to discover the story in 2003.
Captain Carolyn Wood, commander of Alpha Company of the 519th Military Intelligence Battalion, and
Captain Christopher Beiring, commander of the 377th Military Police Company, directed their troops at the Bagram Collection Point to confine their captives with their arms handcuffed above their heads in order to deprive them of sleep.
Lt. Gen. Daniel K. McNeill was later quoted in the press denying that Bagram prisoners had been chained to the ceiling or held in chains attached to the ceiling.
Their troops routinely kneed their captives in the side of their thighs.  They called these "compliance blows".  During a Criminal Investigation Division inquiry their troops claimed they had been told—incorrectly—that this kind of blow was a legal, authorized use of force.

Causes of death
Habibullah's autopsy was performed two days after his death, and classed his death as a homicide.
Dr. Ingwerson said the cause of death was "Pulmonary embolism due to blunt force injury to the legs."
But this did not prevent the GIs staffing the prison from continuing to use these "compliance blows", and a second Afghan, Dilawar, died four days later, on December 10, 2002, under practically identical circumstances.  Dr. Elizabeth Rouse, the coroner for Dilawar, the other murder victim, said she had seen similar damage to a man whose legs had been run over by a bus.

Prosecutions
By 2005, at least 15 American soldiers had been recommended for prosecution by Army investigators for abuse of detainees at Bagram. At least five of the soldiers were charged with crimes involving Habibullah's treatment. Captain Christopher Beiring was charged with dereliction of duty and making false statements; the charges were dropped, but he was reprimanded. Sgt. Christopher Greatorex was tried on charges of abuse, maltreatment, and making false statements; he was acquitted on September 7, 2005. Sgt. Darin Broady was tried on charges of abuse and acquitted on September 9, 2005. Specialist Brian Cammack pleaded guilty to charges of assault and making false statements; he was sentenced to three months in jail, a fine, reduced in rank to private, and given a bad conduct discharge. Pfc. Willie Brand was convicted of other charges, but acquitted of charges relating to abuse of Habibullah.

References

External links
 Failures of Imagination, Columbia Journalism Review, 2005, issue 5
 Human Rights First; Command’s Responsibility: Detainee Deaths in U.S. Custody in Iraq and Afghanistan 

Year of birth missing
2002 deaths
Afghan murder victims
Bagram Theater Internment Facility detainees
Extrajudicial prisoners killed while in United States custody
Afghan people who died in prison custody
Prisoners who died in United States military detention
Afghan torture victims